Visions is a progressive rock album by Clearlight, released in 1978 on Celluloid / LTM Records in France.  (LTM Records is specified on the cover, but the label says Celluloid Records.)

Clearlight's final album set off in yet another new direction: while previous albums incorporated a new age element blended with other styles, this one is primarily a new age album, reflecting the emergence of new age music as a popular genre.  The album is mostly instrumental, but has one song with lyrics and another with spoken word, both in French.  Indian instruments such as sitar and tablas are prominent.  "Fullmoon Raga" expands upon musical themes from "Master Builder" from Gong's You album, blending Indian music with rock music.  The album also incorporates Clearlight's usual psychedelic jazz fusion jamming.

This edition of Clearlight played only one concert (the first since its UK tour in late 1975), at the Olympia in Paris on April 8, 1978, with a variation of the album's line-up: Verdeaux, Malherbe, Lockwood, Mandin, Melkonian and Bouladoux plus Jean-Michel Kajdan (guitar) and Mico Nissim (keyboards). It was badly attended, putting a premature end to the project. This would be the last manifestation of Clearlight until a one-off performance in 1988.

Track listing

Side one
"Spirale d'Amour" (Cyrille Verdeaux) – 7:20
"Messe Caline" (Verdeaux) – 6:30
"Au Royaume des Mutants" (Verdeaux / Francis Mandin) – 6:00

Side two
"Fullmoon Raga" (Clearlight) – 10:55
"Songe de Cristal" (Verdeaux) – 3:50
"Paix Profonde" (Verdeaux / Patrick Depaumanou) – 3:05

Personnel
Cyrille Verdeaux – grand piano, ARP Odyssey, gong
Didier Lockwood – violin (1,2,3,4)
Didier Malherbe – soprano sax (1,3), flute (1)
Philippe Melkonian – bass (1,4)
Jacky Bouladoux – drums (1,3,4)
Luc Plouton – Minimoog (1)
Christian Boulé – electric guitar and "cosmic bottleneck" (2,3)
Gérard Aumont and Gérard Gustin – vocals (3)
Mohamed Taha – Indian tablas (4)
Patrick Depaumanou – Indian sitar (6)
Francis Mandin – synthesizer programming

produced by Cyrille Verdeaux

References

Visions
1978 albums
Celluloid Records albums
Jam band albums